Wheeler–Stokely Mansion, also known as Hawkeye, Magnolia Farm, and Stokely Music Hall, is a historic home located at Indianapolis, Marion County, Indiana.  It was built in 1912, and is a large -story, asymmetrically massed, Arts and Crafts style buff brick mansion. The house is ornamented with bands of ceramic tile and has a tile roof.  It features a -story arcaded porch, porte cochere, and porch with second story sunroom / sleeping porch. Also on the property are the contributing gate house, 320-foot-long colonnade, gazebo, teahouse, gardener's house, dog walk, and landscaped property.

It was added to the National Register of Historic Places in 2004.

References

External links

Houses on the National Register of Historic Places in Indiana
Bungalow architecture in Indiana
Houses completed in 1912
Houses in Indianapolis
National Register of Historic Places in Indianapolis